Boothferry was a non-metropolitan district in Humberside, England. It was abolished on 1 April 1996 and replaced by East Riding of Yorkshire and North Lincolnshire.

Political control
The first election to the council was held in 1973, initially operating as a shadow authority before coming into its powers on 1 April 1974. Political control of the council from 1973 until its abolition in 1996  was held by the following parties:

Council elections
1973 Boothferry District Council election
1976 Boothferry District Council election (New ward boundaries)
1979 Boothferry Borough Council election
1983 Boothferry Borough Council election
1987 Boothferry Borough Council election (Borough boundary changes took place but the number of seats remained the same)
1991 Boothferry Borough Council election
1994 - (Borough boundary changes took place but the number of seats remained the same)

Borough result maps

By-election results

References

External links

 
Council elections in Humberside
District council elections in England